Petrolimex Gas Corporation JSC (PGC:VN) is a liquefied petroleum gas state company in Vietnam, involved in the import, export, distribution and sale of LPG for commercial, residential and industrial uses.  The company's stock is listed on the Ho Chi Minh City Securities Trading Center and it is majority-owned by Petrolimex, which is "Vietnam National Petroleum Group", a petroleum company of the Vietnam government.  The company's main offices are located in Ha Noi; tank farms and container terminals  are located in Ha Noi, Hai Phong, Da Nang, Ho Chi Minh City and Can Tho.  The company's LPG distribution network includes more than 40 companies and a multitude of bottled gas agents and retailers.

References

External links
Petrolimex Gas Corporation JSC official homepage
Petrolimex Gas JSC at Alacrastore
Petrolimex Gas JSC at Bloomberg
Petrolimex Gas JSC at Google finance
Petrolimex Gas JSC at Ho Chi Minh Securities Trading Center

Companies listed on the Ho Chi Minh City Stock Exchange
Oil and gas companies of Vietnam
Liquefied petroleum gas
Petrolimex